Syed Saeed-ur-Rehman, also known by his pen name Suroor Barabankvi, ( 30 January 1919 – 13 April 1980) was a Pakistani Urdu poet and lyricist.

Life and career
Born Syed Saeed ur Rehman in Barabanki, Uttar Pradesh, British India in 1919, he wrote under the pseudonym Suroor (exhilaration). He started his poetry at the age of 18.

He recited his poetry to Jigar Moradabadi, who appreciated his poetic talent. In 1951, Suroor participated in the Independence Day Mushaira at Dhaka, East Pakistan along with Jigar Moradabadi. 

In 1952, he visited East Pakistan where the noted Urdu scholar Abdul Haq offered him the job of General Secretary in the ‘'Anjuman-i Taraqqi-i Urdu’', in their Dhaka branch office and he started a magazine named ‘Filkaar’ there. He also directed three films, all in Urdu: Aakhri Station (1965) in East Pakistan,Tum Mere Ho (1968) and Aashna (1970) in West Pakistan. 
He also wrote some songs for Dhamaka film written by Ibn-e-Safi released in December 1974.

Selected film songs

Filmography
 Chanda (1962 film) (Suroor Barabankvi wrote its story, script and film songs)
 Talash (1963 film)
 Chand Aur Chandni (1966 film)
 Kajal (1965)
 Milan (1964)
 Tum Meray Ho (1968 film) (based on writer Krishan Chander's short story, Anjaan)
 Aashna (1970 film)
 Ehsaas (1972)
 Dhamaka (1974 film)
 Aina (1977)
 Nahin Abhi Nahin (1980)
 Kiran Aur Kali (1981)

Death
In 1980, Suroor Barabankvi went to Dhaka to finalize arrangements for shooting a film where he had a heart attack and died on 13 April 1980. His body was brought to Karachi, Pakistan for burial.

See also
 Ghazal
 Khumar Barabankvi

References

Bibliography

External links

 Suroor Barabankvi @ urdupoetry.com

Urdu-language poets from Pakistan
Muhajir people
People from Barabanki, Uttar Pradesh
1919 births
1980 deaths
20th-century Pakistani poets
20th-century Indian poets
Poets from Uttar Pradesh
Pakistani songwriters
Pakistani film directors